St. Thomas is believed to have landed in Kerala at Kodungallur (Cranganore) in AD 50 and was engaged in evangelical activity.
AD 62 St Thomas returns to Malankara coast via Malayatur where he establishes ‘the half 
Church’ (a small Christian community dependant on the Church of Maliamkara).

Oral tradition says that while travelling through Malayattor, faced with hostile natives, he fled to the hilltop where he is said to have remained in prayer and that he left his foot prints on one of the rocks. According to beliefs, a cross formed on one of the rocks, upon his touch. 
The chief festival is on the first Sunday after Easter. It is traditionally believed that St. Thomas used to make the Sign of the Cross on the rock, kiss it and pray at Kurisumudi. The story has it that a miraculous golden cross appeared at that particular spot. Pilgrims going up the hill call out incessantly "Ponnum Kurishu Muthappo, Ponmala Kayattom", meaning "O Patriarch of the Golden Cross! Climb we shall, this golden hill!"
This Shrine was promoted to Archdiocesan status by Archbishop Mar Varkey Vithayathil on 4 September 1998. There is also a very ancient Church in the name of St Thomas (Estd. 900) at Malayattoor on the bank of Periyar River which serves as the parish Church at present. The annual festival of this church is known as 'Malayatoor Perunal' and it is celebrated in the months of March–April.
St. Thomas and Thamizakam
The place of St. Thomas in the life of Tamil believers is something not to be overlooked. Anyone would be moved at the sight of an ardent but the simple faith of a Tamil pilgrim, a usual seen on the mountain. According to Rt. Rev. Dr. Soosa Pakiami the Archbishop of Trivandrum, "Muthappan" the name by which the devotees invoke St. Thomas on the mountain, may have come from Tamizakam. A good number of pilgrims that visit Kurisumudy and seek Muthappan's blessings is from Tamil Nadu. The vital role played by the caravan route that existed between Kodungalloor and Madras from time immemorial has certainly contributed to this spiritual and cultural bond that exists between Kerala and Tamil Nadu. Later on the hunters went to the mountain for hunting. While they stayed in the night they saw a glittering sign of cross on the rock. Out of curiosity they struck there with their rude weapons. To their surprise blood gushed out. They ran to the valley and told the locals. They went to the mountain and while they prayed there they got many miracles. This is the humble beginning of Kurisumudy Pilgrimage.

Location
Located 52 km from Kochi, the Malayatoor Church is situated atop the 609 m high Malayatoor Hill. The church is dedicated to St. Thomas, who is believed to have prayed at this shrine.  One of the most important Christian pilgrim centres in Kerala, this holy shrine attracts devotees in very large numbers not only from Kerala but also from the neighbouring states. This famous church is situated at Kurisumudi, a verdant hill in the Western Ghats girdled partially by the Periyar (river). The Church has a life-size statue of St. Thomas and the imprint of the feet of the Apostle on a rock. This shrine has now been accorded an international pilgrimage station.

Puthunjayar Pilgrimage to Malayattoor

Malayattoor Kurisumudy is an international pilgrim centre of St. Thomas the Apostle. Kurisumudy is a mountain at Malayattoor, 1269 'Ft. above sea level. Pilgrims come to Malayattoor Kurisumudy all through the year but they come in large numbers during the Lenten season, especially the holy week – largest numbers come on Maundy Thursday and Good Friday. The main feast is on Puthunjayar (new Sunday) the feast of the proclamation of Jesus as Lord and God by St. Thomas the Apostle.
Malayattoor pilgrimage (Climbing Kurisumudy) is done as a vow in reparation of sins. A lot of devotees come to the shrine carrying crosses and walking hundreds of Kilometers. Some of the crosses weight more than 75 Kilograms. Pilgrims climb the mountain praying the Way of the Cross and chanting. When the pilgrims climb the mountain they chant "Ponnin Kurisu Mala Muthappo Ponmalakayattam". "Muthappan" is the name by which the devotees invoke St. Thomas on the mountain. Some pilgrims carry stones on their heads and place them near the Fourteenth station, for the relief of their chronic headaches. Women, sometimes, carry brooms, praying for the abundance of physical and spiritual well being.
 
Kerala Christians believe that St. Thomas the Apostle stayed and prayed at the hill top. While travelling through the famous caravan route from Kodugalioor to Madras, St. Thomas received a hostile reception at Malayattoor and was forced to flee to the top of the mountain and he spent days together in prayer. In deep anguish and agony, St. Thomas prayed to the Lord and he made a sign of the cross on the rock. After a few days he continued his journey to Mylappoor in Chennai and later died a martyr's death in 72 AD
There are many miracle stories about Malayattoor. St. Thomas knelt down on the rock for praying and made a sign of the cross with his finger on the rock and a golden cross sprouted on this spot. When hunters on the mountain tried to remove it with their weapons, the glittering cross began to bleed and they left. Another miracle is the foot-print of St. Thomas on the rock. Now it is covered a glass cover. There is also a miraculous well at the spot where St. Thomas struck the rock when he was thirsty and water gushed out.

The locals began a practice of lighting an oil lamp on the mount and it is said that whenever the lamp was blown out by the wind, a herd of goats would come down wailing and people used to climb the mountain and light the lamp again. Even today pilgrims carry sesame seeds to feed the goats
On 11 February 2004 Vatican declared Kurisumudy as an International Shrine of St. Thomas. The International shrine was officially inaugurated by Archbishop Pedro Lopez Quintana, Apostolic Nuncio in India on 13 February 2005.

Another famous hill pilgrim centre of St. Thomas is the Poonjar Vagamon Kurisumala, where people make pilgrimage on 40th day (Friday) of the Lent and on Puthunjayar.

Medical centres
The Naturopathy Center is near Neeleeswaram at Palayi. St.Thomas Hospital is the major hospital in malayattoor.

Festivals
Christmas and New Year are celebrated with great pomp and show.churches celebrate their anniversaries popularly known as perunnal too with great fervour. Also Traditional festivals like onam are celebrated with great enthusiasm.

Transportation
Nearest Railway Station: Angamaly for Kalady (limited stop), Aluva (major stop)

Nearest airport: Cochin International Airport is about 18 kilometres from Malayattoor. The airport is well connected to all major airports in India and also connected to many foreign cities. Direct flights are available to Chennai, New Delhi, Mumbai, Bangalore and Kolkata.

Tourism
Kodanad, Kaprikkad are some 5 kilometres from this place. Athirapilly, Vazhachal are some 25 kilometres from this place. This attracts tourists from all over Kerala. Also the international shrine of Malayattoor welcomes a huge number of pilgrims. Kalady famous as the birthplace of adi shankaracharya is also popular among the tourists as it is some 10 kilometres from malayattoor. Mahogany Thottam is also a scenic place nearby.

References

Tourist attractions in Ernakulam district
Pilgrimage in India
Christian pilgrimages
Religion articles needing attention